Carol Cleveland (born 13 January 1942) is a British-American actress and comedian, particularly known for her work with Monty Python.

Early life
Born in East Sheen, London, she moved to the United States with her mother and U.S. Air Force stepfather at an early age. She was brought up in Philadelphia, Pennsylvania; Lubbock, Texas; and later Pasadena, California, where she attended John Marshall Junior High School and Pasadena High School. She is a former Miss California Navy and appeared as Miss Teen Queen in MAD Magazine at age 15. Carol was Miss Teen in the August 1958 issue of Dig magazine.

Cleveland returned with her family to London in 1960, and studied at the Royal Academy of Dramatic Art.

Career
A stage actress and model who had appeared as an extra in The Persuaders!, a secretary in The Saint, a lover of Peter Wyngarde's character in The Avengers TV series episode "A Touch of Brimstone" (1966), and other TV shows and films, she started to appear as an extra in BBC comedy productions, including The Two Ronnies, Morecambe and Wise, and various vehicles for Spike Milligan.

Monty Python
Her comedy acting brought her to the attention of the production team of Monty Python's Flying Circus. She appeared in 30 of the 45 episodes in the series, plus all four Monty Python movies. Cleveland has contributed to many post-Python projects including the Concert for George and Not the Messiah (He's a Very Naughty Boy). She has also appeared in many documentaries about the group's history, including Monty Python: Almost the Truth (Lawyers Cut).

Other work
Cleveland was voted number three in Splendor magazine's "100 Most Beautiful Entertainers" list in 1972.

In 1986, Cleveland played an American television journalist in Only Fools and Horses, in the episode "The Miracle of Peckham"; then in 1995, Cleveland had a small cameo in a sketch within Fist of Fun, a BBC comedy show featuring Stewart Lee and Richard Herring. In 2022, Cleveland appeared on an episode of First Dates.

Filmography

Film

Television

References

External links
 

April 2012 interview Monty Python and the Holy Grail Blu-ray
June 2014 interview Monty Python Reunion
 Carol Cleveland - Getty Images

1942 births
Living people
English film actresses
English television actresses
Actresses from London
English women comedians
Alumni of RADA
Comedians from London
Monty Python
English emigrants to the United States
People from East Sheen
Pasadena High School (California) alumni